Pouilly-sous-Charlieu (literally Pouilly under Charlieu) is a commune in the Loire department in central France.

Population

Twin towns — sister cities
Pouilly-sous-Charlieu is twinned with:

  Candiolo, Italy (2007)

See also
Communes of the Loire department

References

Communes of Loire (department)